The 2002 European Archery Championships is  the 17th edition of the European Archery Championships. The event was held in Oulu, Finland from 22 to 27 July, 2002.

Medal table

Medal summary

Recurve

Compound

References

External links
 Results

European Archery Championships
2002 in archery
International sports competitions hosted by Finland
2002 in European sport